Universal Health Care Foundation of Connecticut is an independent, nonprofit organization with offices in Meriden, Connecticut. The foundation supports the mission of its parent organization, CHART (Connecticut Health Advancement and Research Trust). As of 2008, the foundation had assets of approximately $30 million.

History 
In 1997, Attorney General Richard Blumenthal, Comptroller Nancy Wyman and a coalition of advocacy and labor organizations sued the for-profit Anthem Insurance Co. over its merger with the non-profit Blue Cross & Blue Shield of Connecticut.  The aim was to recover tax benefits and other concessions that the former Blue Cross & Blue Shield of Connecticut had received over several decades. The lawsuit was dropped after Anthem Insurance agreed to a settlement in 1999. As a result, the state established the Connecticut Health Advancement and Research Trust. Anthem Foundation of Connecticut was incorporated as a supporting organization to CHART.

It is one of about 165 foundations nationwide to be created by conversions of nonprofit health corporations to for-profit entities. As a condition of these conversions, the law requires that the assets of the nonprofit be retained for some public purpose.

At the time, Blumenthal called the agreement "a historic victory". The foundation received $41 million to carry out the conditions of the settlement. It was charged with working toward system-wide health care reform. The agreement established Anthem Foundation's legal obligation to help improve health care for those who need it most. The foundation was incorporated in 2000. It opened its first offices in New Haven, Connecticut. In January 2003, Juan Figueroa, former community organizer, former Connecticut legislator, former assistant attorney general of Connecticut and former president and general counsel of the Puerto Rican Legal Defense and Education Fund in New York, became foundation president. In 2004, the foundation changed its name to reflect a final separation from the Anthem Blue Cross and Blue Shield of Connecticut. At the time, Figueroa stated that no relationship with Anthem existed, and that the foundation's main focus was passage of universal health care.

Since 2004, the foundation has awarded over $7 million in grants to organizations to advance that goal.
 
In 2007, the Hartford Business Journal chose Juan Figueroa as a 2007 "Health Care Hero".

Frances G. Padilla was appointed as the foundation president in 2012.

Universal Health Care Foundation of CT celebrated its 20th anniversary in 2020. 

The organization continues to focus on health care advocacy in four key areas: affordability, access, accountability, and anti-racism/equity.

SustiNet 
In January 2009 the foundation unveiled SustiNet, a proposal for a statewide health care plan for Connecticut that would provide residents with their choice of health coverage and care regardless of their employment status, age, or pre-existing conditions.

According to analysis by the nation's leading health economists, SustiNet would reduce the proportion of state residents without health coverage from 12 percent to 2 percent by 2014. In addition, SustiNet would bring about savings in the private sector which would far exceed additional state government expenditures.

SustiNet passed its first hurdle in the General Assembly's joint committees on Thursday, March 26, receiving a favorable report from the Public Health Committee, which voted 22-8 to move the bill forward.  On May 20, 2009, the House of Representatives voted 107-35 for SustiNet, and on the 30th, the Senate did the same, 23-12. SustiNet was sent to Governor M. Jodi Rell, who vetoed it on July 8. On July 20 the governor's vetoes were overridden by the Connecticut House of Representatives with a vote of 102 to 40 and then by the Connecticut Senate with a vote of 24-12.

References

External links
 Official website
 healthcare4every1 Campaign
 Office of the Healthcare Advocate
 Small Businesses for Health Care Reform
 http://knowyourhealthproducts.com/

Healthcare reform advocacy groups in the United States
Medical and health foundations in the United States
Organizations established in 2000
2000 establishments in Connecticut
Medical and health organizations based in Connecticut